Centro Direzionale may refer to various business districts in Italy:
 Centro direzionale di Napoli, Naples
 Centro Direzionale di Milano, Milan